USS Hoquiam (PG-113/PF-5), a  patrol frigate in commission from 1944 to 1945 and from 1950 to 1951, she is the only ship of the United States Navy to be named for Hoquiam, Washington. She also served in the Soviet Navy as EK-13 and in the Republic of Korea Navy as ROKS Nae Tong (PF-65).

Construction and commissioning
Hoquiam was laid down under Maritime Commission (MARCOM) contract, MC hull No. 1423, by Permanente Metals Richmond Shipyard #4, Richmond, California, on 10 April 1943. as a patrol gunboat, PG-113, and was reclassified as a patrol frigate, PF-5, on 15 April 1943. Launched on 31 July 1943; sponsored by Miss Helen Philbrick; Hoquiam was commissioned on 8 May 1944, with Lieutenant Commander P. E. Trimble, USCG, in command.

Service history

US Navy, World War II, 1944–1945
After shakedown off the coast of Southern California, Hoquiam departed San Francisco, California, on 20 August 1944, called at Seattle, Washington, and arrived at Kodiak, Territory of Alaska, on 27 August 1944 for duty with the Alaskan Sea Frontier. On 8 March 1945, she became the second racially integrated American naval warship since the Civil War when Coast Guard Lieutenant Commander Carlton Skinner arrived to assume command accompanied by two black officers and thirty colored enlisted men.

Hoquiam patrolled island waters along the Alaskan coast until June 1945 when – having been selected for transfer to the Soviet Navy in Project Hula, a secret program for the transfer of U.S. Navy ships to the Soviet Navy at Cold Bay, Alaska, in anticipation of the Soviet Union joining the war against Japan – she returned to Seattle for an overhaul to prepare her for transfer. She then proceeded to Cold Bay and began training her new Soviet crew.

Soviet Navy, 1945–1949
Commissioned into the Soviet Navy immediately, Hoquiam was designated as a storozhevoi korabl ("escort ship") and renamed EK-13 in Soviet service. She soon departed Cold Bay bound for Petropavlovsk-Kamchatsky in the Soviet Union, where she served as a patrol vessel in the Soviet Far East.

In February 1946, the United States began negotiations for the return of ships loaned to the Soviet Union for use during World War II. On 8 May 1947, United States Secretary of the Navy James V. Forrestal informed the United States Department of State that the United States Department of the Navy wanted 480 of the 585 combatant ships it had transferred to the Soviet Union for World War II use returned, EK-13 among them. Negotiations for the return of the ships were protracted, but on 1 November 1949 the Soviet Union finally returned EK-13 to the U.S. Navy at Yokosuka, Japan.

U.S. Navy, Korean War, 1950–1951
Reverting to her former name, Hoquiam lay idle in the Pacific Reserve Fleet at Yokosuka until the outbreak of the Korean War on 25 June 1950 created a need for more U.S. Navy escorts. She recommissioned on 27 September 1950 with Lieutenant Commander E. A. Lane in command. Following a brief shakedown, she departed to join United Nations naval forces in off Korea. Arriving off Wonsan on 25 October 1950, she served as a harbor control and screening ship during amphibious landings. For the next two months she performed patrol, escort, harbor control, and communications duties along the northeastern coast of Korea.

In late December 1950, Hoquiam assisted with harbor control operations during the evacuation at Hungnam before leaving for Japan. Arriving at Yokosuka on 30 December 1950, she underwent a brief overhaul, then served as a drone target ship off the coast of Japan from late January until early March 1951. She returned to Korean waters on 8 March 1951 and over the next six months operated along the east coast of Korea from Wonsan to Songjin. She participated in interdiction and harassment patrols designed to destroy enemy coastal shipping, conducted antisubmarine warfare operations off Wonsan, and bombarded enemy shore installations and coastal supply routes.

While engaging enemy shore positions on 7 May 1951, Hoquiam was damaged by gunfire. She returned to Japan, arriving at Yokosuka on 16 May 1951 for repairs. Following repairs, she departed on 4 June 1951, called at Sasebo, Japan, and then proceeded to Wonsan, where she arrived on 10 June 1951 to resume bombardment and interdiction duty. She continued patrolling the eastern coast of Korea until September 1951. After returning to Yokosuka on 9 September 1951, she was decommissioned on 5 October 1951.

Republic of Korea Navy, 1951–1973
Upon decommissioning, the ship immediately was leased to the Republic of Korea, and the U.S. Navy eventually struck her name from the Naval Vessel Register on 1 August 1972. She served the Republic of Korea Navy as ROKS Nae Tong (PF-65) from 1951 until she was scrapped in 1973.

Awards
The U.S. Navy awarded Hoquiam five battle stars for her Korean War service.

Notes

References

Bibliography

External links 
 
 hazegray.org: USS Hoquiam

 

Tacoma-class frigates
Ships built in Richmond, California
1943 ships
World War II frigates and destroyer escorts of the United States
African-American history of the United States military
Tacoma-class frigates of the Soviet Navy
World War II frigates of the Soviet Union
Cold War frigates of the Soviet Union
Cold War frigates and destroyer escorts of the United States
Korean War frigates and destroyer escorts of the United States
Tacoma-class frigates of the Republic of Korea Navy
Korean War frigates of South Korea
Ships transferred under Project Hula